Nascia citrinalis is a moth in the family Crambidae. It was described by Warren in 1892. It is found in India.

References

Pyraustinae
Endemic fauna of India
Moths described in 1892
Moths of Africa
Taxa named by William Warren (entomologist)